RCAF Station Tofino (ADC ID: C-36) was a Second World War and Cold War, Royal Canadian Air Force, Radar station located in British Columbia.

History
The site was developed during the early days of World War II and was opened in 1943 as a RCAF "Radio Detachment". The radar at the base was used to protect the Pacific coast from enemy attack. Due to the site's remote location it was equipped with its own airfield. The base was protected by a RCAF Squadron. The site was decommissioned in 1945.  In 1955 the station was reopened again as a radar station in the Pinetree Line. The site was under the control of NORAD. The radar station was closed on 10 January 1958 and is now operated as the Tofino Airport.

Aerodrome information
The aerodrome was listed as "Under construction - Serviceable" with three runways as follows:

Squadrons
 No. 4 Squadron RCAF -  anti-submarine unit under Western Air Command 1941-1945
 No. 132 Squadron RCAF - fighter unit under Western Air Command 1943–1944; disbanded at Sea Island in 1944
 No. 133 Squadron RCAF - fighter unit under Western Air Command spent time in Tofino
 No. 52 Aircraft Control & Warning Squadron - Pinetree Line 1955-1958

References

 Bruce Forsyth's Canadian Military History Page

Defunct airports in British Columbia
Royal Canadian Air Force stations
Military airbases in British Columbia
Military history of British Columbia